Isles FM is a local radio station operating from Stornoway in the Outer Hebrides, Scotland.

The station is operated entirely by a volunteer staff, from a building in the Newton area of the town. Isles FM is the trading name of Western Isles Community Radio Limited, which owns all the equipment. It has recently secured an area of land to construct a purpose-built studio near Seaforth Road in Stornoway.

History 

The station was initially set up in the living room of a local minister, Reverend Stanley Bennie, and operated for a few weeks at a time under a temporary licence as a trial. After proving that the station was feasible, a permanent licence was granted by the UK Radio Authority (now Ofcom) and the station started operating on 1 March 1998. In 2013 the station relocated to custom-built premises in Seaforth Road, Stornoway. Its signal is broadcast from the island's largest transmitter site, Eitshal.

Many of the presenters are amateurs, although former presenter Glenn Denny completed a VQ in Radio Broadcasting through Moray Firth Radio, which made him the only professionally trained presenter with Isles FM. Other notable volunteers with the station include Rodney Collins, who was formerly a journalist with Record Mirror went on to Radios 1 & 2 and was also a member of the Radio Luxembourg team in the 1970s before becoming Managing Director of ILR stations in Scotland and London. One of the younger members of Isles FM, Eilidh MacLennan, has now gone on to work for the BBC as a presenter on Gaelic children's television, Dè a-nis?.

Programme Content 

The station broadcasts a variety of content. The mixture of Gaelic and English programming includes: specialist music, chat shows, children's programmes, and news.

It is often a source of essential information in times of severe weather and other crises, when transport off the islands by ferry or air may be unavailable, or when roads may be closed.

External links 
Isles FM

Radio stations in Scotland
Radio stations in the Highlands & Islands